Hafez Musa Ali Basha was an Albanian politician and mayor of Elbasan from 1928 through 1929.

References

Year of birth missing
Year of death missing
Mayors of Elbasan